The religious views of Fidel Castro are a matter of public interest.

According to The Washington Post, former president of Cuba Fidel Castro's letters from prison suggest that he "was a man of unusual spiritual depth – and a fervent believer in God". Writing to the father of a fallen comrade, Castro writes: I will not speak of him as if he were absent, he has not been and he will never be. These are not mere words of consolation. Only those of us who feel it truly and permanently in the depths of our souls can comprehend this. Physical life is ephemeral, it passes inexorably... This truth should be taught to every human being – that the immortal values of the spirit are above physical life. What sense does life have without these values? What then is it to live? Those who understand this and generously sacrifice their physical life for the sake of good and justice – how can they die? God is the supreme idea of goodness and justice.

Religious upbringing
Castro was baptized and raised a Roman Catholic as a child, but did not practice as one.

Criticism of aspects of religion
In Oliver Stone's documentary Comandante, Castro states, "I have never been a believer", and has total conviction that there is only one life. Pope John XXIII clashed with Castro in 1962 after Castro suppressed Catholic institutions in Cuba, and this led to later claims on the internet that Castro had been excommunicated. However, it appears that these claims are apocryphal. Castro has criticized what he sees as elements of the Bible that have been used to justify the oppression of both women and people of African descent throughout history.

Treatment of religious issues as leader of Cuba
During a visit of Jesse Jackson in 1984, Castro accompanied him to a Methodist Church service where he even spoke from the pulpit with a Bible before him, an event that marked a beginning of increased openness towards Christianity in Cuba. In 1992, Castro agreed to loosen restrictions on religion, and even permitted church-going Catholics to join the Communist Party of Cuba. He began describing his country as "secular", rather than as "atheist". Pope John Paul II visited Cuba in 1998, the first visit by a reigning pontiff to the island. Castro and the Pope appeared side by side in public on several occasions during the visit. Castro wore a dark blue business suit, rather than fatigues, in his public meetings with the Pope, and treated him with reverence and respect.
In December 1998, Castro formally re-instated Christmas Day as the official celebration for the first time since its abolition by the Communist Party in 1969. Cubans were again allowed to mark Christmas as a holiday, and to openly hold religious processions. The Pope sent a telegram to Castro, thanking him for restoring Christmas as a public holiday.

Castro attended a Roman Catholic convent blessing in 2003. The purpose of this unprecedented event was to help bless the newly restored convent in Old Havana, and to mark the fifth anniversary of the Pope's visit to Cuba. The senior spiritual leader of the Orthodox Christian faith arrived in Cuba in 2004, the first time any Orthodox Patriarch has visited Latin America in the Church's history: Ecumenical Patriarch Bartholomew I consecrated a cathedral in Havana and bestowed an honor on Fidel Castro. His aides said that he was responding to the decision of the Cuban Government to build and donate to the Orthodox Christians a tiny Orthodox cathedral in the heart of old Havana. After Pope John Paul II's death in April 2005, an emotional Castro attended a mass in his honor in Havana's cathedral, and signed the Pope's condolence book at the Vatican Embassy. He had last visited the cathedral in 1959, 46 years earlier, for the wedding of one of his sisters. Cardinal Jaime Lucas Ortega y Alamino led the mass and welcomed Castro, who was dressed in a black suit, expressing his gratitude for the "heartfelt way that the death of our Holy Father John Paul II was received (in Cuba)".

In his 2009 spoken autobiography, Castro said that Christianity exhibited "a group of very humane precepts" which gave the world "ethical values" and a "sense of social justice", before relating that, "If people call me Christian, not from the standpoint of religion, but from the standpoint of social vision, I declare that I am a Christian."

On March 28, 2012, Castro had a 30-minute meeting with Pope Benedict XVI, during the Pope's three-day visit to Cuba. The Pope had previously called for an end to the U.S. embargo on Cuba, and the Pope made statements encouraging a more open Cuban society, while Castro asked the Pope about his role and about the changes the Church had experienced over the last century.

On September 20, 2015, Castro met with Pope Francis during the Pope's three-day visit to Cuba, where they discussed protecting the environment and the problems of the modern world.

See also
 Religion in Cuba

References

Fidel Castro
Castro, Fidel